Douglas River is a rural locality in the local government areas (LGA) of Break O'Day and Glamorgan–Spring Bay in the North-east and South-east LGA regions of Tasmania. The 2016 census recorded a population of 30 for the state suburb of Douglas River.

History 
Douglas River was gazetted as a locality in 1968. The name was in use by 1902. It is possibly derived from an 1830s Survey Department draughtsman named Henry Douglas. 

It was originally a coal mining area.

Geography
The waters of the Tasman Sea form the eastern boundary. Douglas River (the watercourse) flows through from west to east, where it empties into Maclean Bay, an inlet of the Tasman Sea.

Road infrastructure 
Route A3 (Tasman Highway) passes through from south to north.

References

Towns in Tasmania
Localities of Break O'Day Council
Localities of Glamorgan–Spring Bay Council